Statistics of North American Soccer League in season 1971. This was the 4th season of the NASL.

Overview
Eight teams competed with Dallas Tornado winning the championship. However Dallas' road to that title was the stuff of legends. In Game 1 of the best-of-three semifinal against the Rochester Lancers, league scoring champion Carlos Metidieri of Rochester mercifully ended the longest match in NASL history, 2–1, late in the 6th 15 minute OT period. The golden goal was scored in the 176th minute, or less than four minutes shy of playing two complete games in one day! Three days later Dallas evened the series at one game each with a 3–1 regulation win. In the rubber match four days later, the two teams ended regulation tied again at 1 goal apiece. This time the game would reach a 4th OT before Bobby Moffat sent Dallas into the Finals in the 148 minute. Incredibly, only four days after that, Dallas lost Game 1 of the NASL Championship Series, 2–1, in the 3rd OT to Atlanta after 123 minutes. All totaled, Dallas had played 537 minutes of soccer (3 minutes short of six games) in 13 days time. Finally the Tornado were able to get control of the finals, pulling away in Games 2 and 3, by scores of 4–1 and 2–0 respectively, to capture the title.

Changes From the previous season

Rule changes
Playoffs series switched from a two-game aggregate score to a best-two-out-of-three match format. Any playoff games tied after 90 minutes would now be settled by golden goal (or sudden death) overtime periods lasting 15 minutes each.

New teams
Montreal Olympique
New York Cosmos
Toronto Metros

Teams folding
Kansas City Spurs

Teams moving
None

Name changes
None

Regular season
W = Wins, L = Losses, T= Ties, GF = Goals For, GA = Goals Against, PT= point system

6 points for a win, 3 points for a tie, 0 points for a loss, 1 point for each goal scored up to three per game.
-Premiers (most points). -Other playoff teams.

1971 NASL All-Stars

Playoffs

Bracket

Semifinals

NASL Final 1971

Game one

Game two

Game three

1971 NASL Champions: Dallas Tornado

Post season awards
Most Valuable Player: Carlos Metidieri, Rochester
Coach of the year: Ron Newman, Dallas
Rookie of the year: Randy Horton, New York

References

 
North American Soccer League (1968–1984) seasons
1971 in American soccer leagues
1971 in Canadian soccer